Daskam is a surname. Notable people with the surname include:

Josephine Daskam Bacon (1876–1961), American writer
Samuel Daskam (1823–1912), American politician